Kai Cipot (born 28 April 2001) is a Slovenian footballer who plays as a defender for NŠ Mura in the Slovenian PrvaLiga. Initially a forward, he switched to his current position in 2022. Internationally, Cipot was capped for Slovenia at under-18, under-19 and under-21 levels.

Career

Mura
A graduate of Mura's youth academy, Cipot made his competitive debut for the club on 11 July 2019 in a 2–0 defeat to Maccabi Haifa during the UEFA Europa League qualifying stages. He scored his first goal later that season, netting the go-ahead goal in a 3–1 victory over Aluminij. In August 2020, Cipot extended his contract with the club for a further two years, to 2024, while it was previously set to expire in June 2022.

Personal life
Cipot's father, Fabijan, formerly played internationally for Slovenia. His younger brother, Tio, is also a professional footballer.

Career statistics

Club

Honours
Mura
Slovenian PrvaLiga: 2020–21
Slovenian Football Cup: 2019–20

References

External links
Kai Cipot at nkmura.si 

2001 births
Living people
People from Murska Sobota
Slovenian footballers
Association football forwards
Association football defenders
NŠ Mura players
Slovenian PrvaLiga players
Slovenia youth international footballers
Slovenia under-21 international footballers